Johannes van Rensburg (born 20 November 1962) is a South African cricketer. He played in two first-class matches for Boland in 1988/89.

See also
 List of Boland representative cricketers

References

External links
 

1962 births
Living people
South African cricketers
Boland cricketers